Stancils Chapel is an unincorporated community in Johnston County, North Carolina, United States, situated on North Carolina Highway 42 and North Carolina Highway 222, east-southeast of Emit. It lies at an elevation of 240 feet (73 m).

References

Unincorporated communities in Johnston County, North Carolina
Unincorporated communities in North Carolina